5-hour Energy 200 can refer to the following NASCAR races:

5-hour Energy 200 (spring race),  The spring/early summer Nationwide Series race at Dover International Speedway held between 2011 and 2013
5-hour Energy 200 (fall race), The fall Nationwide Series race at Dover International Speedway held starting 2013